"Forever Love" is the fourteenth single released by Japanese singer Ami Suzuki in August 2004. This single was her first and only single released by her independent label Amity. It included a B-side called "Chain Love" and the two songs from the single are J-pop tunes. The single performed relatively well, despite poor promotion for it, debuting at #22 on the Oricon Singles Chart and #1 on the Oricon Independent Singles Chart.

Track listing
Forever Love 
Chain Love
Forever Love (Back Track)  
Chain Love (Back Track)

Ami Suzuki songs
2004 singles
2004 songs
Songs written by Ami Suzuki